Landmannalaugar is a location in Iceland's Fjallabak  Nature Reserve in the Highlands. It is at the edge of the Laugahraun  lava field, formed in an eruption in approximately 1477. It is known for its natural geothermal hot springs and surrounding landscape.

Landmannalaugar is at the northern end of the Laugavegur hiking trail, and the Iceland Touring Association operates a mountain hut accommodating  hikers. During the high tourist  season, a small shop and a horse tour agency operate there, as well as the ICE-SAR highland patrol in Fjallabak. Several bus companies have regular trips to and from Landmannalaugar during the tourist season.

Routes 
Four routes lead to Landmannalaugar, including one accessible by car, though the road is rough, with large stones on the road and washboard sections. Rented cars are not allowed on either road, as F roads are usually only for four-wheel-drive vehicles. The most accessible route to Landmannalaugar is via Road 30 from the main road and into Road 32, across the Sultartangi  hydro-electric dam, going onto F26, then F208, and just before arriving in Landmannalaugar, making a right turn onto F224. Road 26 can also be reached directly from Road 1, just before the small village of Hella, passing through a typical Icelandic farmland landscape. There are also roads leading to Landmannalaugar from the east via Eldgjá or the north via Sprengisandur, both 4WD roads only.

Activities

Hiking
Landmannalaugar is famous for its hiking trails. The most popular routes include the two-hour hike through the Laugahraun  [ˈlœiːɣaˌr̥œiːn] lava field to Brennisteinsalda ("Sulphur Wave"), the one-hour hike up Bláhnjúkur ("Blue Peak"), and the four-hour hike to Ljótipollur  [ˈljouːtɪˌpʰɔtlʏr̥] crater lake ("Ugly Puddle"). Landmannalaugar can also be the starting point of several longer hiking trails, such as the three to four-day Hellismannaleið  [ˈhɛtlɪsˌmanːaˌleiːθ] route at the base of the Hekla volcano and the Sprengisandur route for hikers prepared to travel through the volcanic desert.

Landmannalaugar is the usual starting point for a four-day-long hiking trail called Laugavegur, whose name means "The Landmannalaugar Trail"—"Laugar" being a shortened version of "Landmannalaugar". The standard four-day hike ends in Thórsmörk, but one or two days can be added to trek to Skógar near the coast via Fimmvörðuháls between the two glaciers, Eyjafjallajökull and Mýrdalsjökull.

The huts on the Laugavegur and Fimmvörðuháls trails are (from north to south):
 Landmannalaugar 
 Hrafntinnusker 
 Álftavatn
 Hvanngil 
 Botnar 
 Thórsmörk
 Fimmvörðuháls

Other activities
Icelandic horse riding has been available in the area each summer. The horse riding trips visit places, such as Jökulgil  [ˈjœːkʏlˌcɪːl̥] (Glacier Valley), that can often be difficult to access on foot and are inaccessible by car due to no official roads. Arctic char fishing takes place in Landmannalaugar and nearby lakes. Geothermal hot springs are also present in the area and can be publicly used for bathing. From late June through the summer, a shop called the Mountain Mall is operated inside a green American school bus from the 1970s, which stocks groceries and camping items. The buses operate from June through September. The hut is used as a base for cross-country skiing in the winter.

See also
Volcanism of Iceland

References

External links

Information:
The official Landmannalaugar information site
Ferðafélag Íslands; for booking huts on the Laugavegur hiking trail
Description, map view, and track download of the Laugavegur and Fimmvörðuháls trails (south to north)

Photos:
Mountains near Landmannalaugar
 Coming down laugarvegur from Hrafntinnusker
Laugarvegur, in the foreground Brennisteinsalda, right-hand side in the middle ground, Bláhnjúkur
The campground of Landmannalaugar
Panoramic virtual tour of Landmannalaugar

Videos:

Highlands of Iceland
Southern Region (Iceland)